The 2017 Suzhou Ladies Open was a professional tennis tournament played on outdoor hard courts. It was the sixth edition of the tournament and was part of the 2017 ITF Women's Circuit. It took place in Suzhou, China, on 16–22 October 2017.

Singles main draw entrants

Seeds 

 1 Rankings as of 9 October 2017.

Other entrants 
The following players received a wildcard into the singles main draw:
  Sun Xuliu
  Wei Zhanlan
  Yuan Yue
  Zhang Yuxuan

The following players received entry from the qualifying draw:
  Kaja Juvan
  Ye Qiuyu
  You Xiaodi
  Zhang Ling

Champions

Singles

 Sara Errani def.  Guo Hanyu, 6–1, 6–0

Doubles
 
 Jacqueline Cako /  Nina Stojanović def.  Eri Hozumi /  Miyu Kato, 2–6, 7–5, [10–2]

External links 
 2017 Suzhou Ladies Open at ITFtennis.com

2017 ITF Women's Circuit
2017 in Chinese tennis
2017